Pierce Lake is a remote lake of Ontario, Canada. It is in the northwest of the province, near the Ontario-Manitoba border, in Kenora District. There are no roads leading to Pierce Lake, and it is a favourite for remote freshwater fishermen who access it by float plane.

See also
List of lakes in Ontario

References
 National Resources Canada

Lakes of Kenora District